The Cunningham-Hall Model PT-6 was an American six-seat cabin biplane aircraft of the late 1920s and was the first design of the Cunningham-Hall Aircraft Corporation of Rochester, New York.

Development and design

The Cunningham-Hall Aircraft Corporation was formed in 1928 and the first design was the PT-6 (Personal Transport 6-place), which first flew on April 3, 1929. It was flown to the Detroit Aircraft Show two days later, with minor alterations being made later including a switch from a tailskid to a tailwheel.

The PT-6 was a cabin biplane with an all-metal structure that was stressed to meet military strength specifications rather than the much more lenient commercial requirements, however aside from the cabin, which was covered with corrugated aluminum, most of the airframe was fabric covered. It had a fixed landing gear with a tail wheel. The cockpit held a pilot and either a copilot or passenger, with a separate cabin for four passengers.  The aircraft was powered by a  Wright J-6-9 Whirlwind radial engine.

The company's final aircraft was a freighter conversion the PT-6F. A freight door was fitted to the fuselage and a loading hatch fitted in the roof. It was powered by a Wright R-975E-1 radial engine of slightly greater power.

Only two PT-6s (s/n 2961 X461E and s/n 2962 NC692W) and one PT-6F (s/n 381 NC16967/NPC44/NC444) were registered, however as many as six of each type may have been built. The discrepancy from many publications with higher numbers may indicate that from two to nine additional airframes were built, but scrapped without being registered or sold, due to the collapse of the aviation market with the deepening of the Great Depression. A production line had been set up, and materials bought to produce 25 examples.

Plans for a slightly smaller 4-seat derivative to be named the PT-4, and an armed military variant were also cancelled.

Operational history
One example was used for charter flying by the Rochester - Buffalo Flying Service, often fitted with skis or floats. One customer was the Fairchild Aviation Corporation. George Eastman of Kodak had his first flight in PT-6
The PT-6F was supposed to have been one of three built from parts still available from the original cancelled production run, for an expected Philippine customer, and even carried the Philippine registration of NPC-44, however a lack of funds caused that sale to be cancelled. The aircraft was eventually sold for around $7,000, and made its way to Alaska for a career as a bush plane with Byers Airways.

Variants

PT-6
Six-seat cabin biplane powered by a  Wright J-6 Whirlwind radial engine.
PT-6F
Freighter version of the PT-6.
PT-4
Cancelled 4 place version.
PT-6 Bomber
Cancelled bomber with turret.

Survivors and aircraft on display
PT-6F s/n 381 NC444, formerly NC16967 and NPC44  was restored to airworthy condition and as of 2008 was on display at the Golden Wings Museum at Anoka County-Blaine Airport, near Minneapolis.
PT-6 s/n 2962 NC692W was restored to display-only status and cannot be flown, and is at the Alaska Museum of Transportation and Industry in Wasilla, Alaska  and has been listed on the National Register of Historic Places.

Specifications (Cunningham-Hall PT-6, ATC #177)

See also
1929 in aviation

References

Notes

Citations

Bibliography

1920s United States civil utility aircraft
PT-6
Single-engined tractor aircraft
Biplanes
Aircraft first flown in 1929